The 2014 Grand Prix Cycliste de Québec was the fifth edition of the Grand Prix Cycliste de Québec, a single-day professional bicycle road race. It was the 25th event of the 2014 UCI World Tour season. The race was one of only two events which are part of the World Tour calendar in North America, the other one being the 2014 Grand Prix Cycliste de Montréal contested two days later.

Teams
As the Grand Prix Cycliste de Québec was a UCI World Tour event, all 18 UCI ProTeams were invited automatically and obligated to send a squad. A Canadian national squad also competed in the race, and as such, forming the event's 19-team peloton.

The 19 teams that competed in the race were:

Canada (national team) †

Results

References

External links
 

2014
2014 UCI World Tour
Grand Prix Cycliste de Quebec
2014 in Quebec